Dikome Balue is the headquarters of Dikome Balue subdivision and has an area of  situated in the heart of a rainforest region of Ndian Division in the southwest region of Cameroon.

A composite volcano of the Cambrian type that has not erupted in our recent times. This mountain range connects with the Manenguba, kupe, Fako and Equatorial Guinea highlands.

This area is inhabited by a Bantu people who originated from the Congo Basin of Central Africa. The dialect spoken here is Lolue (a type of Oroko) with about 98% similarity with the other ethnic dialects like Mbonge, Bima, Londo, Batanga etc.

Oroko language has a 75% similarity with the Lingala(Kikongo) spoken in Congo and Zaire. The main difference between the two is that Lingala is often mixed with French while Oroko is mixed with English or just simply spoken with no foreign accents. Oroko and Bakongo people of Congo and Zaire share almost the same cultures

Communes of Southwest Region (Cameroon)